The 2014 EuroChallenge Final Four was the concluding tournament of the 2013–14 EuroChallenge season. The tournament was held in the PalaDozza in Bologna, Italy. It was the second time a EuroChallenge Final Four was held in Bologna.

Host Grissin Bon Reggio Emilia came out of the tournament as the EuroChallenge champion, after it beat Triumph Lyubertsy in the Final. The Italian player Andrea Cinciarini won the MVP award.

Bracket

Semifinals

Third place game

Final

References

Final four
FIBA EuroChallenge Final Fours
2012–13 in Turkish basketball
2012–13 in Italian basketball
2012–13 in Russian basketball
2012–13 in Hungarian basketball
International basketball competitions hosted by Italy
Sport in Bologna